Hriadky is a village and municipality in the Trebišov District in the Košice Region of south-eastern Slovakia.

History
In historical records the village was first mentioned in 1320.

Geography
The village lies at an altitude of 111 metres and covers an area of 3.315 km².
It has a population of about 470 people.

Ethnicity
The village is almost entirely Slovak in ethnicity.

Facilities
The village has a public library and a football pitch.

Genealogical resources

The records for genealogical research are available at the state archive "Statny Archiv in Kosice, Slovakia"

 Greek Catholic church records (births/marriages/deaths): 1805-1895 (parish B)
 Reformated church records (births/marriages/deaths): 1749-1905 (parish B)

See also
 List of municipalities and towns in Slovakia

External links
https://web.archive.org/web/20070513023228/http://www.statistics.sk/mosmis/eng/run.html
Surnames of living people in Hriadky

Villages and municipalities in Trebišov District
Zemplín (region)